The Malta men's national water polo team is the representative for Malta in international men's water polo.

Results

Olympic Games
1928 – Quarterfinals
1936 – First round

European Championship
 2016 – 15th place
 2018 – 16th place
 2020 – 16th place
 2022 – 14th place

Team

Current squad
Roster for the 2020 Men's European Water Polo Championship.

Head coach: Karl Izzo

Notable players
Stevie Camilleri – best scorer at the 2016 European Championship

References

Water polo
Men's national water polo teams
National water polo teams in Europe
National water polo teams by country
 
Men's sport in Malta